Lucky Pierre (also known as I'm Losing My Temper) is a 1974 French comedy film directed by Claude Zidi.

Plot
Pierre Dubois is a mathematics teacher at an all-girls high school in Aix-en-Provence. He also works as a ghostwriter for his father the mayor, who is seeking re-election, and for his friend who works for a tabloid newspaper.

When Pierre's students sitch the contents of his folders as a joke, a speech for the mayor, an article on a famous actress, and his students' papers all end up in the wrong hands.

Pierre finds himself on a film set trying to resolve the mix-up, and ends up spending the night at the house of a famous actress. The tabloids catch wind, and the next day's headlines provoke dismay for the mayor and for Pierre's fiancée.

Cast

References

External links
 
 

1974 films
1974 comedy films
Films about tabloid journalism
Films directed by Claude Zidi
Films scored by Vladimir Cosma
French comedy films
1970s French films